MgA. Michal Janiga (October 12, 1991) in Považská Bystrica is a Slovak sculptor and artist.

Biography 
Michal Janiga is a native of Pružina. He is a graduate of the Academy of Fine Arts in Prague, where he graduated from the Studio of Figural Sculpture and Medals. He lives in Prague, where he works in own studio. He has had several author exhibitions and realizations in Slovakia, Norway, Italy and the Czech Republic.

Selected works

Carl Gustav Swensson Memorial 
In 2021 was the co-author of the Carl Gustav Swensson Memorial in C. G. Swensson Park in Žilina. He designed and created the Swensson's portrait. The author of the memorial sculpture is the landscape architect Marek Sobola. The collaboration of these two artists created the largest memorial dedicated to a prominent Swedish landscape architect in Europe. The work combines pigmented concrete, stainless steel and elements of the green infrastructure.

Others important works and exhibitions 

 Statue of St. John of Nepomuk in Pružina-Priedhorie (2012).
 "Mimo predpoklad". Exhibition with Petra Lomnická, MG Gallery, Považská Bystrica, Slovakia (2018)
 Author of Ondrej Sobola's portrait, which was based on the only surviving photograph. Ondrej Sobola's story was the impetus for the creation of the international Tree of Peace initiative (2018).
 Exhibition "Negative Realism" (You're Broken When Your Heart's Not Open), Lienemann-Stifung für Bildung und Kunst Award, Tschechisches Zentrum, Berlin, Germany (2019)
 "The Run Slovakia" (relay race). Realisation of trophies and medal, production cooperation with Hydro Extrusion Slovakia (2019).
 Second place in art competition for monument of the 700th anniversary of the Žilina town, Slovakia. Cooperation with Marek Sobola in 2021.
 Exhibition "Nesnesitelné teplo domova", garden of the Cultural center H55, Prague, Czech Republic (2021).
 Portrait of Romanian King Michael I (2021).
 Portrait of Serbian King Peter I of Serbia (2021).

Other activities 
On November 3, 2021, Michal Janiga took part in the official planting of a memorial tree in Žilina planted on the occasion of the Platinum Jubilee of Her Majesty The Queen Elizabeth II, the very first Jubilee tree in Central Europe. A memorial common oak (Quercus robur), also known as an English oak, was planted in Carl Gustav Swensson Park in Žilina. The planting was carried out under the Official auspices of the British Embassy in Bratislava and was inspired by the official program “The Queen’s Green Canopy“. The tree was planted by Her Majesty's Ambassador to Slovakia Nigel Baker  together with the author of this idea Marek Sobola, Michal Janiga and the Mayor of Žilina Peter Fiabáne. Žilina's planting has a leading position throughout Central Europe – as the very first planting of the “Platinum Jubilee Tree”.

Gallery

References

External links 

 Michal Janiga: Official website

Living people
Slovak artists
Slovak sculptors
1991 births
People from Považská Bystrica